The 2005 Hong Kong Chief Executive election was held to fill the vacancy of the territory's top office. Then Chief Executive Tung Chee-hwa submitted his resignation to the central government in Beijing, and was officially approved on 12 March. As Donald Tsang, Chief Secretary for Administration in Tung's cabinet, was the only candidate, he was declared elected unopposed on 16 June. Tsang took office on 21 June to begin his first two-year term.

Background
During the 1996 and 2002 elections, an 800-member Election Committee was used to elect the Chief Executive. Unlike the US system, there is no universal suffrage or universal right to vote.  Senior employees, managers and professionals mainly vote pro-China to ensure their businesses can run smoothly.  They were entirely biased in favour of Beijing's stance in the previous two elections.

The previously elected Tung Chee-hwa had long been an unpopular Chief executive.  Tung claimed his health was deteriorating early in 2005 and announced he was ready to resign. He filed for resignation on 10 March, and two days later it was approved. An election was scheduled on 10 July to select the new Chief Executive. In the interim, Tsang and later Henry Tang served as acting Chief Executives in accordance with the Basic Law.

There were debates over the term of office for Tung's successor: whether the new Chief Executive should serve Tung's remaining two-year term or a full five-year term. The government tabled Chief Executive Election (Amendment) (Term of Office of the Chief Executive) Bill. Since the election and the term of the Chief Executive are regulated by the Basic Law, to settle the disputes, the Acting Chief Secretary filed a request for interpretation of the Basic Law to the PRC National People's Congress Standing Committee (NPCSC), amidst some oppositions to the request. On 27 April, the NPCSC interpreted Article 53 that

Relevant text of the Basic Law

Article 52
Article 52 item 1 cites a health illness as an acceptable reason for resignation:

Given the status of this resignation as voluntary (as Tung claims), and there are allegations that the citing of health reasons may not be an actual truth, as there is technically nothing prohibiting the use of excuses in such a manner. It is rumoured that the actual motive is a decision imposed by the central government, but it can also be a desire to spend more time with the family or many other reasons.

Article 53
Article 53 gives the provisions for an acting Chief Executive.

This gave Donald Tsang, the Secretary of Administration at the time, the right to act as Chief Executive from 12 March to 25 May.  He then had to resign, since it was illegal for him to become a candidate while acting as Chief Executive at the same time. Henry Tang, who was then Financial Secretary, filled him in according to the article.  He then appointed Michael Suen as the new (acting in the interim) Chief Secretary. When Tsang was elected he was brought before the central government for approval and inauguration.  The second section of Article 53 gives provisions for a new election.

The process is well defined under this clause, and Tsang's term as acting Chief Executive was limited to six months. The Chief Executive Election Ordinance defines the time as 120 days, give or take a few days, (ensuring an election on Sunday rather than on a weekday), which made 10 July the date for the election, if one had been warranted by multiple candidature.

Election Committee by-elections

In April 2005, 33 vacancies (27 from the regular constituencies, 6 from the religious sector) existed in the Election Committee. Nominations were accepted over a one-week timeframe from 9 to 15 April to fill the seats. The six empty seats in the religious sector were appointed by the religious councils. Out of the 27 seats in 16 subsectors, 12 candidates were immediately declared elected to their seats because there were no more candidates competing than the number of seats available, and hence, these ones were declared elected unopposed.

In the other seven constituencies, where 15 vacancies were present, a poll was held on 1 May, and the count was conducted smoothly with all the elected candidates expected to be entered onto the official listing of Election Committee members within the near future. The by-election was marked by voter apathy, where only 15% of the eligible population turned up, with some constituencies reporting as low as 12%, despite the pleadings of the Hong Kong Government. Only two subsectors, Agriculture and Fisheries (85%) and District Council (86%) had higher voter turnouts than one quarter.

Candidates
From 3 to 16 June nominations were open to candidates who wanted to participate in this election. The support of 100 Election Committee members is required (Ann. 1, Sect. 4, above) for nominations to be valid. Given the largely pro-China status of the Election Committee, it became common for the favoured candidate of the Chinese government to get elected unopposed. Given there were four vacancies in the EC, 697 signatures would theoretically be necessary to secure unopposed election.

Nominee

Withdrawn

Other minor invalid candidates included Chan Yuet-tung, Li Hau, Allen Tam Kwan-sui, Vincent Yang Yuen-shan, Yun Shat-man.

Expressed interest but did not run
 Emily Lau Wai-hing, convenor of The Frontier and member of the Legislative Council
 James Tien Pei-chun, chairman of the Liberal Party and member of the Legislative Council

Nominations
Tsang instantly became the frontrunner in the race to succeed Tung. According to Tsang's election website, he engaged in "closed door meetings" with individual EC members. Tsang was criticised for refusing to publicly debate with the other two competitors, and was accused of stifling debate, of obstructing a free discussion within the community about his position on the issues of the day.

Beijing was accused of pressuring, and intimidating EC members to support Tsang; some EC members reportedly left Hong Kong to avoid the pressure. The Standard cited high-level sources saying that Beijing hoped Tsang would forestall any possibility of being challenged for the office by securing at least 500 to 700 nominating votes. Sources close to Tsang confirmed Beijing was worried that a contested election could lead to political uncertainty, and wanted to be sure that "no one runs against their man".

On 15 June, Tsang handed in his nomination form which bore the signatures of 674 members of Election Committee. Later in the evening, the Returning Officer, Madam Justice Carlye Chu Fun Ling vetted the nomination form and determined that his nomination as a candidate in the election was valid. The other candidates failed, having garnered fewer than the required 100 backers, Tsang was declared the only valid candidate in the election. Tsang was declared elected unopposed on 16 June, gazetted by the Government on 21 June, and duly inaugurated on 24 June.

Campaign finances
During the election campaign, Donald Tsang received about HK$27.33 million sponsorship for the campaign, about 20% of which came from the businessmen from the property sector. Although Tsang stated publicly that each sponsor could not sponsor in excess of one hundred-thousand Hong Kong dollars, some of the businessmen sponsored him in different names, for example, Stanley Ho and Lee Shau Kee each sponsored HK$1 million under their family members' names. In the end Tsang used only HK$4.12 million of the sponsorship. The remaining HK$23.21 million would be donated to 14 charitable organisations.

References

External links

Laws
Basic Law of Hong Kong
Chief Executive Election Ordinance (Cap 569) (pdf format)
Chief Executive Election Ordinance (Cap 569) (html format)
Election Guidelines for the 2005 by-election
Chief Executive election guidelines

Pages from the Hong Kong Government's election website
2005 Chief Executive election website- the home page for the website (See also Chinese version)
2005 Election Committee by-elections- the home page for the EC by-elections. (See also the Chinese version.)
Candidate Platforms and Background Information
Election Results

Press Releases from the Hong Kong Government
The most recent are listed at the top.

Chief Executive elections
Validation of Tsang's nomination
Donald Tsang's nomination
Allen Tam's nomination
Li Hau's nomination- this nomination application was later ruled invalid
Chan Yuet Tung's nomination
ECA's warning on electoral law violation
Announcement on the opening of nominations
SCA's comments after the Chief Executive Ordinance Amendment Bill is passed by LegCo

Election Committee by-elections
Comments given after the election
Voter Turnout Rates
Secretary of Constitutional Affairs' speech regarding the election
Announcement on opening of polls
Announcement on the accepting of nominations

On the interpretation of the Election laws
Clarifications on the CE election guidelines- presented in a question-and-answer format
Decision on implementing a 2-year term for the new CE

Tung Chee-hwa's resignation
Donald Tsang's Acting Chief Executive statement
Remarks from the news conference following the resignation
Donald Tsang's speech concerning the resignation
Tung Chee-hwa's resignation speech

Hong Kong Chief Executive elections
2005 elections in China
2005 in Hong Kong
Uncontested elections